The 2018 GT4 Central European Cup was the first and only season of the GT4 Central European Cup, a sports car championship created and organised by the Stéphane Ratel Organisation (SRO). The season began on 28 April at Most and ended on 7 October at Zandvoort. It was discontinued for 2019, with the new ADAC GT4 Germany taking over its position in the Central European market.

Calendar
On 15 December 2017, the Stéphane Ratel Organisation announced the 2018 calendar.

Entry list

Race results
Bold indicates overall winner.

Championship standings
Scoring system
Championship points were awarded for the first ten positions in each race. Entries were required to complete 75% of the winning car's race distance in order to be classified and earn points. Individual drivers were required to participate for a minimum of 25 minutes in order to earn championship points in any race.

Drivers' championship

Teams' championship

See also
2018 GT4 European Series
2018 French GT4 Cup

Notes

References

External links

GT4 European Series
GT4 Central European Cup
GT4 Central European Cup